Kinsham Grange may have been a priory near the River Lugg in Herefordshire, England at .  It now seems likely that an error by John Tanner in 1744 confused this site with one at Great Limber in Lincolnshire and there was never a priory here.

References

Monasteries in Herefordshire